Fade in may refer to:

Dissolve (filmmaking), a type of transition used in visual media
Fade (audio engineering), a similar type of transition used in audio media
Fade In (magazine), an online film magazine 
Fade In (film), 1968 film  
Fade In, an unpublished non-fiction book by Michael Piller about Star Trek: Insurrection
Fade In (software), professional screenwriting software

See also 
"Fade Out/In", a song by Paloalto
"Fade Out, Fade In", an episode of M*A*S*H
Fade Out - Fade In, a Broadway musical
Fade (disambiguation)
Fade out (disambiguation)